Cheranalloor Shiva Temple is a 1300 years old temple located at Cheranalloor, Ernakulam, Kerala, India. It is accessible from Kalady and Perumbavoor town.

The temple of Shiva at East Cheranallore is one among the 108 Shiva temples of Kerala. The Lord is in his ascetic form here, hence worship with fragrant flowers, incense sticks is forbidden. The temple had extensive land holdings and was in receipt of approximately 24 tons of paddy a year. Consequent to agrarian reforms the temple lost all the land except a couple of acres in which the temple is situated. The temple had fallen from its golden days and is struggling for survival. The temple is quite ancient and was tile roofed about 100 years ago. There are  "Gurukkal","Ambalavasis" like Nambiars, Sharodys, Marars etc., in temple administration. They all are held a prominent position in the temple administrations.

The deity is also known as Rn (ऋण) Mochaka, i.e., liberator of debts. The annual poojas are done in March every year. The temple should be protected as a heritage monument.

Shiva temples in Kerala
Hindu temples in Ernakulam district